Kahriz Gizhian (also Romanized as Kahrīz Gīzhīān; also known as Kahrīz Bāzvand and Kahrīz) is a village in Bazvand Rural District, Central District, Rumeshkhan County, Lorestan Province, Iran. At the 2006 census, its population was 1,475, in 318 families.

References 

Populated places in Rumeshkhan County